Nikolaos Morakis (sometimes seen as Dorakis) was a Greek shooter.  He competed at the 1896 Summer Olympics in Athens. Morakis came third in the military pistol event with 205 points behind the American brothers John and Sumner Paine, and fourth in the free pistol event.

References

External links

Year of birth missing
Year of death missing
Greek male sport shooters
Olympic shooters of Greece
Shooters at the 1896 Summer Olympics
19th-century sportsmen
Olympic bronze medalists for Greece
Olympic medalists in shooting
Medalists at the 1896 Summer Olympics
Place of birth missing
Place of death missing